Merchant Taylors' Girls' School is a selective private girls' school in Great Crosby, Merseyside, England.

History

Merchant Taylors' Girls' School was established in 1888, having inherited the buildings from the boys' school that had moved less than a mile away in 1874. The then governing body was dilatory in providing for the 'new' school and it was due to the insistence of James Fenning, the Master of the Worshipful Company of Merchant Taylors, that the girls' school was started. At the School's opening all of the female staff were graduates. This was a feat, considering that at the time only four universities granted degrees to women. In June 1888, twelve pupils attended the school, by the 1920s it had grown to 300 and, in 2014, the figure has almost doubled. The continuing increase in pupil numbers enabled the purchase in 1911 of the adjoining house, "The Mulberries", which doubled the existing space. One of the buildings is the now Grade II-listed 1620s building (currently housing the library). Two generous donations from a former headmistress ensured further development of facilities forming the basis of the network of buildings.

The early prefect system was replaced in 1972 with the more democratic system of Sixth Form committees still in place today. In 2008, the House System was reintroduced and the four houses were renamed Minerva, Thalia, Gaia and Selene. The houses compete as they have since 1917 in points, academia, and sports.

Latin was taught at the school from the beginning, as was mathematics, although if students chose to study higher mathematics they had to be chaperoned up to the boys' school. Early governors of the school insisted that the girls learnt traditional female pastimes alongside these more rigorous subjects, hence sewing, cooking and singing all played their part on the curriculum. Sport ranges from hockey, hill-rambling, badminton, cross-country running and rowing to self-defence.

Organisation
As of 2013, it has 511 pupils, ranging in age from 11 to 18. The current headmistress is Mrs Claire Tao. The school also has an associated prep school, Stanfield Mixed Infants and Junior Girls' School, which takes both boys aged 4–7 and girls aged 4 to 11. After attending the mixed infants school, the boys go on to the Junior section of Merchant Taylors' Boys' School, Crosby, less than a mile down the road.

The school is one of nine with links to the Worshipful Company of Merchant Taylors, including boys' school Merchant Taylors' School, Northwood and Merchant Taylors' Boys' School, Crosby. The school's motto is that of the Worshipful Company: Concordia Parvae Res Crescunt. (Small things grow in harmony.)

The school is independently run and charges tuition fees of £11,733 per year.
Fees were partially subsidised by the Government under the Assisted Places Scheme until the closure of that scheme in 2001. The Schools now run their own means tested Assisted Places Scheme under which about 20% of pupils benefit from free, or reduced-fee places. The schools offer around £1 million a year in bursaries. About 17 per cent of pupils at the two senior schools receive assistance, worth up to 100 per cent of the  annual fees.

It is a member of the Girls' Schools Association. Headmistress Mrs Louise Robinson was President of the Association in 2012.

In 2013, Merchant Taylors’ was Crosby's best performing school with 100% of pupils at the Girls’ school achieving five Cs or above in any subject at GCSE.

Community links
Links with the local community have always been important. In 1911 the school adopted a 'waif' from the local children's home and formed a link which continued beyond the 1940s. A war effort was also undertaken during WW2, making camouflage netting, scrubbing floors at local hospitals and raising money for 'Warships Week'. Today's Sixth Formers continue this tradition by helping local schools, charity shops and nursing homes.

Exchange programme
Merchant Taylors is partnered through the British Council's Connecting Classrooms Programme with Nelson Mandela High School, Sierra Leone. Since 2010, the schools have participated in exchange visits. The partnership has enabled Nelson Mandela High to become a 'Sustainable School'.

Sport

Rowing
The school (along with the associated boys' school) runs the Merchant Taylors' School Boat Club which is affiliated to British Rowing (boat code MTS). The school competes in the British Rowing Championships. The junior under 14 double scull won the national title at the 2015 British Rowing Junior Championships and the junior under 15 double scull (composite with Trafford RC) won the national title at the 2016 British Rowing Junior Championships.

Notable former pupils

 Beryl Bainbridge, novelist, was expelled
 Kelly Cates, television presenter
 Dame Jean Davies, Director of the Women's Royal Naval Service
 Dame Janet Finch, sociologist and Vice Chancellor of Keele University
 Jane Garvey, BBC radio presenter
 
 Clare Lilley, art curator
Jennifer Johnston, mezzo-soprano
 Adele Roberts, Radio 1 and Radio 1 Xtra DJ
 Dr Julie Smith, politician
 Emma Watkinson, entrepreneur
 Eleanor Worthington Cox, actress

See also
Listed buildings in Great Crosby

References

External links
 
 Independent Schools' Inspectorate report, 2007

Worshipful Company of Merchant Taylors
Private schools in the Metropolitan Borough of Sefton
Girls' schools in Merseyside
Grade II* listed buildings in Merseyside
Educational institutions established in 1888
1888 establishments in England

Crosby, Merseyside
Scholastic rowing in the United Kingdom